Mario Faubert  (born December 2, 1954) is a Canadian retired professional ice hockey defenceman and politician.

Hockey career
Faubert played two seasons at Saint Louis University before being drafted by the Pittsburgh Penguins in the 1974 NHL amateur draft. His early career was split between the Penguins and the AHL's Hershey Bears. He played his first full season in 1981, and finished the year first among Pittsburgh defenceman in scoring. On November 18, 1981 Faubert suffered a tragic career ending leg injury in a game versus St. Louis.

Political career
In February 2003, the Parti libéral du Québec announced that Mario Faubert would be its candidate in the riding of Beauharnois for the upcoming Quebec general election. He was named the liberal candidate after the Beauharnois-Huntingdon district was split in two and incumbent André Chenail chose to ride in Huntingdon. He got 42.77% of the vote but lost by 639 votes to Parti Québécois candidate Serge Deslières.

Awards and honours

Career statistics

References

External links

1954 births
Living people
Binghamton Dusters players
Canadian ice hockey defencemen
French Quebecers
Hershey Bears players
Sportspeople from Salaberry-de-Valleyfield
Pittsburgh Penguins draft picks
Pittsburgh Penguins players
Saint Louis Billikens men's ice hockey players
Vancouver Blazers draft picks
Ice hockey people from Quebec